Kamini Damini is an Indian television drama series which premiered on 27 December 2004 on Sahara One. The series is based on Bollywood movie Seeta Aur Geeta, and stars Hema Malini in the main lead. The show replaced Sridevi starring Malini Iyer. The show ended in 2005.

Plot
The story revolves around the life of two twin sisters, Kamini and Damini, who get separated in their youth but later reunite after several years later. Damini then replaces her sister to solve her problems and protect her family members who torture her.

Cast
 Hema Malini as Kamini / Damini
 Pankaj Dheer as Damini's Husband 
 Anang Desai
 Shashi Sharma
 Dharmesh Tiwari
 Rajesh Puri
 Sudesh Berry
 Nasirr Khan
 Hrishikesh Pandey as Vijay, Damini's son
 Mazher Sayed as Damini's son
 Vishal Watwani as Damini's son
 Ekta Sharma as Damini's Daughter-in-law 
 Chitrapama Banerjee as Damini's Daughter-in-law

References

Sahara One original programming
Indian drama television series
2004 Indian television series debuts
2005 Indian television series endings
Television series about twins